Cirsium neomexicanum is a North American species of thistle known by the common names New Mexico thistle, powderpuff thistle, lavender thistle, foss thistle and desert thistle.

This plant is native to the southwestern United States and northwestern Mexico, particularly the Mojave and Sonoran Deserts. It has been found in California, Nevada, Arizona, Sonora, Utah, Colorado, New Mexico, and Texas.

Description
Cirsium neomexicanum is a tall plant, routinely exceeding  in height. It erects a stem which may have webby fibers and long, stiff spines. The sparse leaves are greenish-gray, hairy, and very spiny.

Atop the mainly naked stems are inflorescences of one or more large flower heads with rounded bases and phyllaries covered in long, curving spines. The largest heads may be up to 5 centimeters (2 inches) in diameter. They are packed with white or lavender to pink disc florets but no ray florets.

The fruit is a flat brown achene with a long pappus which may reach 2 cm long. Unlike many other thistles, this species tends not to be a troublesome noxious weed.

References

External links

photo of herbarium specimen at Missouri Botanical Garden, collected in Utah, isotype of Cirsium utahense (synonym of C. neomexicanum)
Jepson Manual Treatment of Cirsium neomexicanum
United States Department of Agriculture, National Forest Service, Index of Species Information, Cirsium neomexicanum

neomexicanum
North American desert flora
Flora of the Southwestern United States
Flora of Sonora
Plants described in 1853